Nikolaos Panagiotopoulos (born 18 August 1965 in Kavala) is a Greek politician of the New Democracy party who has been serving as Minister for National Defence in the cabinet of Prime Minister Kyriakos Mitsotakis since 2019.

Political career
During Panagiotopoulos' time in office, the Greek parliament approved the purchase of six new and 12 used Dassault Rafale fighter aircraft from France for 2.5 billion euros ($3.04 billion) in January 2021. Later that year, he led efforts on a defence pact between Greece and France, a NATO ally, whereby they would come to each other's aid in the event of an external threat. The pact included an order for three French frigates worth 3 billion euros.

References 

Living people
1965 births
People from Kavala
New Democracy (Greece) politicians
Ministers of National Defence of Greece
Greek MPs 2019–2023